The 2007–08 Guinness Premiership was the 21st season of the top flight of the English domestic rugby union competitions, played between September 2007 and May 2008. Round 1 included the London Double Header at Twickenham, between the four London teams.

Due to the 2007 Rugby World Cup the season started a week later than usual, as England were trying to defend their title. Leeds Tykes, which renamed themselves Leeds Carnegie shortly after the 2006-07 season, were promoted from National Division One 2006-07, taking the place of Northampton Saints who were relegated.

During the course of the season, London Wasps went from 10th in the league during October, to beat Leicester in the Guinness Premiership Final.

Teams
Leeds Carnegie, having won the 2006–07 National Division One, replaced Northampton Saints, who were relegated last season after finishing bottom of the table.

Notes

Table

If teams were level at any stage, tie-breakers applied in the following order:
 Number of matches won
 Difference between points scored and allowed
 Total number of points scored
 Aggregate number of points scored in matches between tied teams
 Number of matches won excluding the first match, then the second and so on until the tie is settled

Results

Round 1

Round 2

Round 3

Round 4

Round 5

Round 6

Round 7

Round 8

Round 9

Round 10

Round 11

Rearranged fixtures

Round 12

Round 13

Round 14

Round 15

Round 16

Round 17

Round 18

Round 19

Rearranged fixtures

Round 20

Round 21

Rearranged fixture

Round 22

Play-offs

Semi-finals

Final

Top scorers
Note: Flags to the left of player names indicate national team as has been defined under World Rugby eligibility rules, or primary nationality for players who did not earn international senior caps. Players may hold one or more non-WR nationalities.

Most points
Source:

Most tries
Source:

References

External links
 Official site

 
2007-08
 
England